Joseph Weeks (February 13, 1773 – August 4, 1845) was a United States Representative from New Hampshire.  He was the grandfather of Joseph Weeks Babcock who represented Wisconsin in the United States Congress from 1893 to 1907. He was born in Warwick, Massachusetts, where he attended the common schools. Later, he moved to Richmond, New Hampshire, where he engaged in agricultural pursuits.

Weeks served as the town clerk of Richmond, New Hampshire 1802–1822. He also served as a member of the New Hampshire House of Representatives 1807–1809, 1812, 1813, 1821–1826, 1830, and 1832–1834 and as an associate judge of the court of common pleas 1823 and 1827. He was elected as a Jacksonian to the Twenty-fourth Congress and reelected as a Democrat to the Twenty-fifth Congress (March 4, 1835 – March 3, 1839). He died in Winchester, New Hampshire in 1845.

References

1773 births
1845 deaths
People from Warwick, Massachusetts
New Hampshire state court judges
Democratic Party members of the New Hampshire House of Representatives
Jacksonian members of the United States House of Representatives from New Hampshire
19th-century American politicians
Democratic Party members of the United States House of Representatives from New Hampshire
People from Richmond, New Hampshire